Aleksey Tarakanov (born 26 March 1996) is a Belarusian former professional footballer.

References

External links 
 
 
 Profile at FC Minsk website 

1996 births
Living people
Belarusian footballers
Association football midfielders
FC Minsk players
FC Smorgon players
FC Isloch Minsk Raion players
FC Belshina Bobruisk players
FC Traktor Minsk players